Martin Booth (7 September 1944 – 12 February 2004) was an English novelist and poet. He also worked as a teacher and screenwriter, and was the founder of the Sceptre Press.

Early life
Martin Booth was born in Lancashire England, the son of Joyce and Ken Booth, the latter of which was a Royal Navy civil servant. Martin has said that his parents had a difficult marriage, as his father was stern, pompous, and humourless, while his mother was adventurous, witty, and sociable. The family moved to Hong Kong in May 1952, where his father was stationed for a three-year tour as a grocery supplier to the British Navy. In his memoir “Gweilo: A memoir of a Hong Kong Childhood” Booth recalls that the streets of Hong Kong were safe, and he would explore the city alone as a child. He encountered things he was unfamiliar with: dogs hung in a butcher shop, an impoverished family living in a packing crate, and a Russian refugee who claimed to be the missing Russian princess Anastasia. People would touch his blond hair for good luck. He and his mother also learned Cantonese. He attended Kowloon Junior School, the Peak School, then King George V School, and left in 1964.

From 1965 to 1968 he attended Trent Park College of Education in Cockfosters, North London, part of what is now Middlesex University. His main subject was science, and he obtained the Certificate of Education.

Career
In England, Booth worked as a truck driver, legal clerk, wine steward, and English teacher (in Rushden). He also taught English at Castle School, Taunton.

In 1974 Booth was Poetry Editor of Fuller d'Arch Smith, founded by Timothy d'Arch Smith and Jean Overton Fuller. He had recently bought a house in Knotting in North Bedfordshire, and was instrumental in finding Fuller a house in Wymington which also became the registered office of the company.

Booth first made his name as a poet and as a publisher by producing elegant volumes by British and American poets, including slim volumes of work by Sylvia Plath and Ted Hughes.  His own books of verse include The Knotting Sequence (1977), featuring the character Cnot who founded the hamlet Knotting. The book was named for the village in which Booth was living at the time. The book features a series of lyrics in which he seeks links between the present and the Saxon past, and the man called Knot who gave his name to the village. Booth also accumulated a library of contemporary verse, which allowed him to produce anthologies and lectures.

In the late 1970s Booth turned mainly to writing fiction. His first successful novel, Hiroshima Joe, was published in 1985.  The book is based on what he heard from a man he met as a boy in Hong Kong and contains passages set in that city during the Second World War.

Booth was a veteran traveller who retained an enthusiasm for flying, also expressed in his poems, such as "Kent Says" and In Killing the Moscs.  His interest in observing and studying wildlife resulted in a book about Jim Corbett, a big-game hunter and expert on man-eating tigers.

Many of Booth's works were linked to the British imperial past in China, Hong Kong and Central Asia. Booth was also fond of the United States, where he had many poet friends, and of Italy, which features in many of his later poems and in his novel A Very Private Gentleman (1990). These interests form a thread through his later novels, travel books and biographies.

Booth's novel Industry of Souls was shortlisted for the 1998 Booker Prize.

The 2010 film The American, starring George Clooney, was based on his novel A Very Private Gentleman.

Three Booth's novels have been translated into French : Gweilo, Music on the Bamboo Radio and The American.

Works

Poetry
Paper Pennies and Other Poems (1967)
Supplication to the Himalayas. A Poem and Sketch (1968)
In the Yenan Caves (1969)
A Winnowing of Silence (1971) (poems)
Pilgrims and Petitions (1971)
The Crying Embers (1971) (poems)
On the Death of Archdeacon Broix (1971)
James Elroy Flecker, Unpublished Poems and Drafts (1971) (editor)
White (1971)
In Her Hands (1973) (poem)
Teller: Four Poems (1973)
Brevities (1974) (poems)
Hands Twining Grasses (1974) (poems)
Spawning the Os (1974)
Yogh (1974) (poems)
Snath (1975)
Two Boys and a Girl, Playing in a Churchyard (1975) (poem)
Stalks of Jade: Renderings of early Chinese erotic verse (1976)
Horse and Rider, a poem (1976)
The Book of Cats (1977) (editor with George MacBeth)
Extending Upon the Kingdom (1977)
Folio/Work in Progress. Poems (1977) (broadside anthology, editor with John Stathatos)
The Knotting Sequence (1977)
The Dying (1978)
The Earth Man Dreams of a Turned Sod (1978)
Winter's Night: Knotting (1979)
Decadal: Ten Years of Sceptre Press (1979)
Calling with Owls (1979) (poems)
The Bad Track (1980) (novel)
Devil's Wine (1980) (poems)
Bismarck (1980)
British Writing Today (1981) (editor)
The Cnot Dialogues (1981)
Meeting the Snowy North Again (1982) (poems)
Looking for the Rainbow Sign: Poems of America (1983)
Tenfold: Poems for Frances Horovitz (1983) (editor)
Travelling Through the Senses: A Study of the Poetry of George MacBeth (1983)
Contemporary British and North American Verse (1984) (editor)
British Poetry 1964 to 1984: Driving Through the Barricades (1985)
Killing the Moscs (1985)
Under the Sea (Impressions) (1985)
Aleister Crowley: Selected Poems (1986)
American Dreams. A Poem (1992) (broadside)
The Humble Disciple (1992) 
The Iron Tree (1993) 
Toys of Glass (1995) 
Adrift in the Oceans of Mercy (1996)

Fiction
Hiroshima Joe (1985) 
The Jade Pavilion (1987) 
Black Chameleon (1988) 
Dreaming of Samarkand (1989) 
A Very Private Gentleman (1990) (reissued as The American following adaptation for the 2010 film The American)
War Dog (1996) 
Music on the Bamboo Radio (1997) 
The Industry of Souls (1998) 
PoW (2000)
Panther (2001)
Islands of Silence (2002) 
The Alchemist's Son: Doctor Illuminatus (2003) (fantasy)
Midnight Saboteur (2004)
The Alchemist's Son: Soul Stealer (2004)

Nonfiction
Carpet Sahib: A Life of Jim Corbett (1986) (biography)
Rhino Road: The Black and White Rhinos of Africa (1992)
Opium: A History (1996)
Doctor and the Detective: a Biography of Sir Arthur Conan Doyle (1997)
Magick Life: A Biography of Aleister Crowley (2000)
The Dragon Syndicates: The Global Phenomenon of the Triads (2000)
Cannabis: A History (2003) 
Gweilo: Memories of a Hong Kong Childhood (2004) [US ed., 2005, published as Golden Boy]

Works translated into French
The American, Florent Massot, (2010)
Gweilo - Récit d’une enfance hongkongaise, Éditions Gope, (2016)
Ici Radio-bambou, Éditions Gope, (2019)

References

External links
Obituary in the Guardian
"Martin Booth: Poet and novelist with a keen sense of place," The Independent
"Martin Booth," Obituary in The Times
"Hong Kong's Golden Boy, Time
Reviews of The Alchemist's Son
Carpet Sahib, Title & Introduction by Martin Booth
Bibliography, Babelio

1944 births
2004 deaths
20th-century biographers
20th-century English novelists
20th-century English poets
20th-century English male writers
Alumni of King George V School, Hong Kong
Alumni of Middlesex University
British expatriates in Hong Kong
Deaths from cancer in England
English biographers
English children's writers
English male novelists
English male poets
English travel writers
Writers from Lancashire
English male non-fiction writers
Male biographers